Williamson Airfield  is located near Rockhampton, Queensland, Australia within the Shoalwater Bay Military Training Area.

Williamson Airfield was the setting for the Royal Australian Air Force's recruiting video "Impossible Airfield", filmed during Exercise Talisman Sabre 2011. No381 Expeditionary Combat Support Squadron and associated units set up a fully functional airbase support unit in just 36 hours. Despite the impression given in the video, the unit did not create the airfield from scratch, the runway and ramp were already present.

See also
 List of airports in Queensland

References

Australian Army bases
Airports in Queensland